Tottenham is a small town in Lachlan Shire in the Central West of New South Wales, Australia. Tottenham is known as “The Soul of the Centre”, a reference to it being the nearest town to the geographical centre of New South Wales.

History
Tottenham is at the end of a railway line from Bogan Gate, completed in 1916, with Tottenham Post Office opening on 8 April 1907.

Location
Tottenham lies in a wheat-growing area. A cairn marks the centre of New South Wales and is located 33 km west-north-west of Tottenham.

Beginning in September 2008, the annual Far Cairn Rally for touring motorcyclists has been held at the Tottenham Race Course. The name alludes to the cairn being far from Sydney. It is organised by the BMW Touring Club of New South Wales.

Achievements
In 2012, the tiny township was selected as the Most Outstanding Community in New South Wales and the ACT (with a population of 15,000 or less) in a competition organised by Prime7.

Airstrip
The town sealed its local airstrip, installed kangaroo-proof fences around the perimeter, and put in night lighting, with half of the costs coming from private donations. Locals had been upset that the Royal Flying Doctor Service had not been able to land there for a medical emergency involving one of the leading members of the local population.

Medical and other services
The town also successfully searched the world to recruit its own doctor, when the Health Department had said that no suitable doctor could be found.  Five locals came forward to form a team of local volunteer ambulance officers, in support of the two full-time paramedics that are provided by the NSW Ambulance Service.  Finally, the town constructed a spacious sports centre in a dollar for dollar agreement with the local Shire.  All of these projects in the one year contributed to Tottenham's selection as Community of the Year for NSW.

Climate

References

External links

Towns in New South Wales
Towns in the Central West (New South Wales)
Lachlan Shire